The beach soccer tournament at the Baku 2015 European Games was held from 24 to 28 June. It was the first edition of beach soccer at the European Games.

Eight men's teams, comprising 96 athletes, competed over five days of the competition.

Medal summary

Qualification
Azerbaijan is qualified as host country. The remaining seven teams have qualified through the 2014 Euro Beach Soccer League (EBSL). The top three teams from each group in the Superfinal will qualify. The top team from the Promotional Final, excluding the 12th team from Division A, will also qualify.

Group round

Group A

Group B

Classification matches

Bracket

5–8th place semifinals

Seventh place match

Fifth place match

Knockout round

Bracket

Semifinals

Bronze medal match

Gold medal match

References

 
Sports at the 2015 European Games
2015

2015 in beach soccer
International association football competitions hosted by Azerbaijan